William Frank Boyland was a New York Assemblyman from 1982 to 2003. In January 2003, he resigned his seat, and his son William Boyland, Jr. was elected to fill the vacancy.

Assemblyman Thomas S. Boyland was his brother. The influential family has been described as a dynasty.

References

African-American state legislators in New York (state)
Democratic Party members of the New York State Assembly
Living people
Year of birth missing (living people)
21st-century African-American people